Wiltz is a canton in northwestern Luxembourg. Its capital is the city of Wiltz. It covers an area of 264.55 km2, and  it has a population of 16,735.

Administrative divisions
Wiltz Canton consists of the following seven communes:

 Boulaide
 Esch-sur-Sûre
 Goesdorf
 Kiischpelt
 Lac de la Haute-Sûre
 Wiltz
 Winseler

Mergers
 On 1 January 1979 the former communes of Harlange and Mecher (both from Wiltz Canton) were merged to create the commune of Lac de la Haute-Sûre.  The law creating Lac de la Haute-Sûre was passed on 23 December 1978.
 On 1 January 2006 the former communes of Kautenbach and Wilwerwiltz (both from Wiltz Canton) were merged to create the commune of Kiischpelt.  The law creating Kiischpelt was passed on 14 July 2005.
 On 1 January 2012 the former communes of Heiderscheid and Neunhausen (both from Wiltz Canton) were absorbed into the commune of Esch-sur-Sûre. The law expanding Esch-sur-Sûre was passed on 31 May 2011.  
 On 1 January 2015 the former commune of Eschweiler (from Wiltz Canton) was absorbed into the commune of Wiltz. The law expanding Wiltz was passed on 19 December 2014.

Population

References

 
Cantons of Luxembourg